Sláine (sometimes anglicized as Slaine) is an Irish given name.

People
Notable people with this name include:

 Slaine (rapper), hiphop MC from Boston
 Sláine ingen Briain (fl. 1014), daughter of Brian Boru and wife of Sigtrygg, king of Dublin
 Sláine mac Dela of the Fir Bolg, the first legendary High King of Ireland
 Slaine Kelly (born 1982), Irish actress

Fictional characters
Fictional characters include:
 Sláine (comics), comic book hero inspired by Celtic mythology
Sláine: The Roleplaying Game of Celtic Heroes, role-playing game based on the setting

Irish-language unisex given names